TP Central Odisha Distribution Limited (TPCODL) (earlier Central Electricity Supply Utility of Odisha (CESU)) is responsible for medium voltage power transmission and distribution across 9 districts of Odisha. Originally, the licence to operate in the central region of state covering 9 districts was guaranteed in 1999, by Odisha Electricity Regulatory Commission under the provision of Odisha Electricity Reform Act, 1995 to Central Electricity Supply Company of Odisha Ltd. However, the license was revoked in April 2005, and the management was shifted under Central Electricity Supply Utility of Odisha ( Operation  and Management ) in September 2006. The company provides daily power requirement to the state load dispatch center which monitors and controls the grid operations.

Tata Power Limited, a subsidiary of Tata Group,  took over the management of Central Electricity Supply Utility (CESU) from 1 June 2020. The Odisha Electricity Regulatory Commission (OERC) that awarded the Letter of Intent (LOI) to TPCL on 12 December 2019. Tata Power will hold 51 per cent equity with management control and the State-owned Gridco will have the remaining 49 pc equity stake in the company. The company retained all the existing employees of CESU and will govern them by their existing  policy structure. Tata Power has received a license for 25 years. Spread over 30,000  km2, CESU has five electrical circles consisting of the areas of Bhubaneswar (Electrical Circle - I and II), Cuttack, Paradip and Dhenkanal with a population of over 1.4 crore and consumer base of 2.5 million. With CESU, Tata Power aims to expand its consumer base to 5 million consumers from the present base of 2.5 million across Mumbai, Delhi and Ajmer. After the acquisition it no longer remains a PSU under Govt Of Odisha.

References

Energy in Odisha
State agencies of Odisha
State electricity agencies of India
Organisations based in Bhubaneswar
1999 establishments in Orissa
Indian companies established in 1999